Shraga Weil (September 24, 1918 – February 20, 2009) was an Israeli painter.

Biography
Weil was born in Nitra, Czechoslovakia in 1918 to a family of teachers, journalists and merchants. His father was a building engineer. He was sent to study with a local sculptor, and then to the Academy of Art in Prague. He produced his first graphic works during World War II, during which he spent as a prisoner. After the War, he sailed for Israel on an illegal immigrant ship. He arrived in Israel in 1947 and became a member of Kibbutz HaOgen, where he lived until his death.

In 1954, he studied murals and graphic techniques at the Ecole des Beaux-Arts, Paris. He also studied mosaics in Ravenna with Professor Severini.

Weil died on February 20, 2009.

Work
Weil's works have been exhibited in the United States, South America, Canada, Australia, France, Slovakia, the USSR, Switzerland, and in the International Exhibition of Graphic Arts, in Lugano.

Weil's artwork is in the permanent collections of Brandeis University, Waltham, Massachusetts, Israel Museum, Jerusalem, Fogg Museum, Harvard University, Los Angeles County Museum, Jewish Museum, New York, Philadelphia Museum of Art, Joslyn Museum, Omaha, Nebraska, Judah Magnes Museum, Berkeley, CA, as well as others.

Awards
In 1959, Weil was awarded the Dizengoff Prize for Painting.

Gallery

References

Further reading
 "Twelve Israeli Painters'', Published by Lion the Printer, Tel Aviv, 1965
 "Shraga Weil - 60 years of Printmaking", Gideon Ofrat, Safrai Fine Art Gallery Jerusalem, 2000, 148 pages

External links 
 Short biography for Shraga Weil Knesset website 
 Official website of Shraga Weil  official website 

Modern painters
Israeli painters
Slovak Jews
Hungarian Jews
Israeli Jews
Czechoslovak emigrants to Israel
People from Nitra
Israeli illustrators
Kibbutzniks
1918 births
2009 deaths